WAYN (an acronym for Where Are You Now?) is a social travel network. Its stated goal is to help discover where to go and meet like-minded people. WAYN was founded in 2002.

WAYN has been known to send spam emails to all contacts of its users Others have raised concerns that they misuse users data to make money. Other sources of income include showing advertising for places a person is visiting.

Like other social networking services, WAYN enables its users to create a profile and upload photos. Users can search for other users and link them to their profiles as friends. In 2015 it claims to have over 20 million users. In late 2016, the website was bought by Lastminute.com for 1.2 million which allows the project to continue but was insufficient to pay off debts. Before the sale the site had been losing money and traffic.

As of 22 January 2021, it is no longer a social network website, it now operates merely as a gateway for Lastminute.com to sell its products.

History 
WAYN was founded in 2002 in London by Jérome Touze (Co-CEO), Peter Ward (Co-CEO) and Mike Lines (CTO), after two of them came up with the idea to connect people based on their location while having a few beers in their local pub.
WAYN initially grew through word-of-mouth and reached almost 50,000 members by the end of 2004. Following its relaunch in May 2005 it reached over 2.5 million members by the end of 2005. On 26 March 2012 the site claimed "over 19.1m members".

The business started with initial seed funding in 2003 from the original founder of Friends Reunited.

In 2006, the WAYN Founders managed to complete a Series A Fund Raising of $11 million from DFJ Esprit and attracting famous internet entrepreneurs such as Brent Hoberman (ex founder of lastminute.com), Hugo Burge (CEO of cheapflights.co.uk), Adrian Critchlow and Andy Phillips (ex founders of Active Hotels) and Constant Tedder (ex CEO of Jagex, an online gaming company) and was referred to at the time as the 'MySpace of Travel'.

As of 2015, the site claimed to have over 20 million users. In 2016, Lastminute Bought WAYN's Assets for Just $1.2 Million

Services
WAYN users may post photos from their trips. Registered users send and receive messages using email, discussion forums, E-cards, SMS, and instant messages and Q&A. WAYN provides a destination browsing service to discover Where to go next and WAYN members can interact with each other and ask questions on the destinations through a Questions & Answers service. The site also provides Social Opinions which generated over 25,000 opinions daily in 2014. In 2015, WAYN has announced major strategic partnerships with Booking.com to offer hotels booking to its users  as well as Viator to offer tours and activities booking.

Contact import 
Like many other social media sites, WAYN encourages its users to invite their friends which in turn leads to the contacts of the members to receive an invitation to join. In 2006, some members have vented their frustration claiming they were not aware that an invitation would be sent to their contacts. The company acknowledged that this process could be improved and has since changed the way in which these invitations get generated and has also signed up with Return Path, one of the few white listing companies in the world which certifies Emails Best Practice.

Use 
WAYN Alexa Internet traffic ranking was 12,251 as of March 2017 down more than 2,000 position from the prior year. It claimed in 2013 to house user data for over 22 million users in 193 different countries.

Monetisation 
WAYN.com commercialises its website through advertising and integrated brand engagement solutions. The site also offers a membership service (VIP) for users who wish to access to travel and lifestyle benefits. More recently, the site launched a travel booking service for users to book their hotels and tours globally.

References

Further reading
 
 
 

British social networking websites
British travel websites